Glossocephalus milneedwardsi is a species of amphipod in the family Oxycephalidae. It is epipelagic and lives in association with ctenophores.

References 

Hyperiidea
Animals described in 1887